Al Aziziya is a district in the municipality of Al Rayyan in Qatar, located on the outskirts of Doha.

Landmarks

The Qatar Center for Voluntary Activities was established in the district in July 2001. It encourages volunteer work among the nation's youth and is responsible for organizing large-scale events for volunteers.
Fereej Aziziya Stadium, managed by the Qatar Olympic Committee, is located on Al Wasl Street.
Aziziya Commercial Complex is located on Al Aziziya Street.
Aziziya Family Park is located on Al Andab Street.
Aziziya Medical Complex is found on Salwa Road.
Both The Ministry of Interior's General Directorate of Civil Defence and Qatar Charity maintain branches in Al Aziziya.
Doha Zoo is situated on Al Furousiya Street in Al Aziziya. It was opened in the 1980s as Qatar's first zoo. In 2013, it was announced that the zoo would be converted into a safari park at a cost of approximately $55 million.

Transport
Currently, the underground Al Aziziya Metro Station is under construction, having been launched during Phase 1. Once completed, it will be part of Doha Metro's Gold Line.

Education

The following schools are located in Al Aziziya:

References

Populated places in Al Rayyan